Carlos Alberto Lourenço Milhazes (born 17 March 1981) is a Portuguese former professional footballer who played as a left back.

Club career
After beginning professionally with lowly Clube Caçadores das Taipas, Póvoa de Varzim-born Milhazes joined hometown club Varzim S.C. (in the second division). After appearing scarcely for Boavista F.C. in 2004–05's Primeira Liga, his first top-flight season, he signed with Rio Ave FC, experiencing both relegation and promotion.

In late January 2008, Milhazes joined Romanian Liga I side FC Politehnica Timișoara, first on loan. After the move was made permanent, he returned to Portugal exactly one year after and signed with Vitória de Guimarães on loan until the end of the campaign, as a replacement for Jacques Momha who left for Turkey; in June 2009, he agreed to a permanent contract.

On 31 July 2010, having appeared rarely for Vitória throughout the league season, Milhazes returned to Rio Ave as a free agent. He finished his career well into his 30s, after spells with two teams in the Superleague Greece as well as Varzim.

References

External links

1981 births
Living people
People from Póvoa de Varzim
Portuguese footballers
Association football defenders
Primeira Liga players
Liga Portugal 2 players
Segunda Divisão players
Clube Caçadores das Taipas players
Varzim S.C. players
Boavista F.C. players
Rio Ave F.C. players
Vitória S.C. players
G.D. Chaves players
Liga I players
FC Politehnica Timișoara players
Cypriot First Division players
Enosis Neon Paralimni FC players
Super League Greece players
OFI Crete F.C. players
Levadiakos F.C. players
Portuguese expatriate footballers
Expatriate footballers in Romania
Expatriate footballers in Cyprus
Expatriate footballers in Greece
Portuguese expatriate sportspeople in Romania
Portuguese expatriate sportspeople in Cyprus
Portuguese expatriate sportspeople in Greece
Sportspeople from Porto District